Sanandaj Airport ( – Farūdegāh-e Sanandaj)  is an airport serving the city of Sanandaj in the Kurdistan Province, Iran. The airport has a small number of domestic and regional destinations.

Airlines and destinations

Website
http://sanandaj.airport.ir/

References

  Službene stran
 ice Zračne luke Sanandadž
  DAFIF, World Aero Data: OICS
  DAFIF, Great Circle Mapper: SDG

Towns and villages in Sanandaj County
Airports in Iran
Buildings and structures in Kurdistan Province
Transportation in Kurdistan Province